The Iguape War occurred during 1534-1536, in the region of São Vicente, São Paulo. Due to the interpretation of the Treaty of Tordesilhas, some Spaniards, led by Ruy Garcia de Moschera, established themselves around Vicentina. They were allied with indigenous Carijós, founded a village (a I-Caa-Para) and won several battles against French corsairs.

When Portuguese Brazilian forces faced the Spanish contingent, Portuguese forces were promptly defeated. Subsequently, Garcia de Moschera and his followers occupied and looted São Vicente, including carrying away the livro de tombo (parish log). Notwithstanding, after repeated incursions the Portuguese Brazilian forces forced the Spanish to retreat, first to Ilha de Santa Catarina, and after that to Buenos Aires.

See also
 Entrincheiramento de Iguape
 Cosme Fernandes

References

 Donato, Hernâni. Dicionário das batalhas brasileiras. São Paulo: Ibrasa, 1987.
 Luz Soriano, Simão José da. Historia da Guerra Civil e do estabelecimento do governo parlamentar em Portugal, comprehedendo a historia diplomatica, militar e politica d'este reino desde 1777 até 1834. Lisboa, Impr. Nacional, vol IV, 1870 p. 497.
 Ernesto Guilherme Young Esboço Histórico da Fundação da cidade de Iguape. Revista do IHGSP, vol II, São Paulo, 1896 pp. 49–151.

Wars involving Brazil
Wars involving Spain
History of São Paulo
1530s conflicts
1540s conflicts